The 2019 Toulon Tournament (officially ) was the 47th edition of the Toulon Tournament. It was held in the department of Bouches-du-Rhône from 1 to 15 June 2019. England were the defending champions but they were eliminated in the group stage.

In this season the tournament was contested by under-22 national teams, although France, Portugal, England and Republic of Ireland played with their under-18, under-19, under-20 and under-21 teams, respectively.

Brazil won their ninth title by defeating Japan 5–4 in a penalty shoot-out in the final, after the match had finished in a 1–1 draw.

Participants
Twelve participating teams were announced in March and April 2019.

AFC
 (2nd participation)
 (13th participation)
 (14th participation)
 (6th participation)
CONCACAF
 (1st participation)
 (25th participation)

CONMEBOL
 (17th participation)
 (5th participation)
UEFA
TH (21st participation)
 (42nd participation)
 (30th participation)
 (7th participation)

Squads

Venues
A total of five cities hosted the tournament.

Initially, Stade Marcel Cerdan (Carnoux-en-Provence) would host the ninth-place and seventh-place playoffs but the matches originally to be played there would be moved to Stade d'Honneur (Mallemort) and Stade Parsemain (Fos-sur-Mer).

Match officials
The referees were:

 Aliyar Aghayev
Assistants: Zeynal Zeynalov and Akif Amirali
 Felipe González Alveal
Assistants: Raúl Orellana and Alejandro Molina
 Willy Delajod
Assistants: Aurélien Berthomieu and Philippe Jeanne
 Alex Johnson
Assistants: Edward Spiteri and Theodore Zammit
 Luis Enrique Santander
Assistants: Christian Espinosa and Michel Alejandro Morales

 António Nobre
Assistants: Pedro Mota and Nuno Pereira
 Salman Falahi
Assistants: Yousuf Al-Shamari and Zahy Alshammari
 Robert Hennessy
Assistants: Emmett Dynan and Robert Clarke
 Horațiu Feșnic
Assistants: Alexandru Cerei and Mihai Marius Marica

Matches rules
Every match consisted of two periods of 45 minutes each. In a match, every team had eleven named substitutes and the maximum number of substitutions permitted was four (a fifth substitution was allowed only for goalkeepers).

In the knockout stage, if a game tied at the end of regulation time, extra time would not be played and the penalty shoot-out would be used to determine the winner.

Group stage
The draw was held on 8 April 2019. The twelve teams were drawn into three groups of four. In the group stage, each group was played on a round-robin basis. The teams were ranked according to points (3 points for a win, 1 point for a draw, and 0 points for a loss). If tied on points, the following criteria would be used to determine the ranking: 1. Goal difference; 2. Goals scored; 3. Fair play points. The group winners and the best runners-up qualified for the semi-finals. The Group stage was played from 1 to 9 June 2019.

Group A

Group B

Group C

Classification matches
The eliminated teams played another game to determine their final ranking in the competition.

Eleventh place playoff

Ninth place playoff

Seventh place playoff

Fifth place playoff

Knockout stage

Semi-finals

Third place playoff

Final

Statistics

Goalscorers

MVP of the matchday

Awards

Individual awards
After the final, the following players were rewarded for their performances during the competition.

Best player:  Douglas Luiz
Second best player:  Lyanco
Third best player:  Ao Tanaka
Fourth best player:  Jayson Molumby
Breakthrough player:  Vitinha
Best goalkeeper:  Chen Wei
Topscorer:  Matheus Cunha
Youngest player of the final:  Paulinho
Best goal of the tournament:  Paulinho 
Fair-Play:

Best XI
The best XI team was a squad consisting of the eleven most impressive players at the tournament.

See also
2019 Sud Ladies Cup

References

External links
Maurice Revello Tournament

 
2019
2018–19 in French football
2019 in youth association football
Toulon Tournament